Gals, Incorporated is a 1943 American comedy film directed by Leslie Goodwins and written by Edward Dein. The film stars Leon Errol, Harriet Nelson, Grace McDonald, David Bacon, Betty Kean, Maureen Cannon and Lillian Cornell. The film was released on July 9, 1943, by Universal Pictures. The film included the singing group The Pied Pipers.

Plot

Cast        
Leon Errol as Cornelius Rensington III
Harriet Nelson as Gwen Phillips
Grace McDonald as Molly
David Bacon as Bill Rensington
Betty Kean as Bets Moran
Maureen Cannon as Bubbles
Lillian Cornell as Vicki
Minna Phillips as Jennifer Rensington
Marion Daniels as Virginia
Jo Stafford as Member of The Pied Pipers
Chuck Lowry as Member of The Pied Pipers 
John Huddleston as Member of The Pied Pipers 
Clark Yocum as Member of The Pied Pipers
Glen Gray as himself

References

External links
 

1943 films
American comedy films
1943 comedy films
Universal Pictures films
Films directed by Leslie Goodwins
American black-and-white films
1940s English-language films
1940s American films
English-language comedy films